The Simhadri Express is an Express train in India which runs between Guntur and Visakhapatnam  in Andhra Pradesh. This train is named after the god, Simhadri appanna in simhachalam of Andhra Pradesh . The Vijayawada division of the South Coast Railway division of the Indian Railways administers this train.

Numbering
Train Number 17240 runs from Visakhapatnam Jn to Guntur to while 17239 runs from Guntur to Visakhapatnam Jn

Route
The train starts from Visakhapatnam Jn at 07:10 hours and reaches Guntur at 15:30 hours the same day. In the return direction it leaves Guntur at 08:00 hours and reaches Visakhapatnam Jn at 16:00 hours the same day. The train runs via  Eluru,
Vijayawada

Rake sharing
This train has rake sharing with 12748/12747 Palnadu Superfast Express

Locomotive
The train is generally hauled by WAP-7 Lallaguda (LGD) Loco shed.

Classes
The 21 coach composition contains–  1 AC Chair Car, 4 Chair car Sitting, 14 General,2 SLR 
It runs with ICF coaches (Green indicating Electric locomotive, Yellow indicating colour of the general coaches, pink indicating reserved coaches and blue indicating AC coaches)
Coach Composition from Guntur to Visakhapatnam as 12739 

Coach Composition from Visakhapatnam to Guntur as 12740

See also
 Visakhapatnam Swarna Jayanti Express
 Samata Express
 Godavari Express
 Hirakud Express

References

Transport in Guntur
Transport in Visakhapatnam
Named passenger trains of India
Rail transport in Andhra Pradesh
Express trains in India